First Baptist Church of Glenarden International or FBCG is a Baptist Evangelical megachurch located in Upper Marlboro, Maryland. It is affiliated with Converge. Weekly church attendance was 10,548 people in 2020. The senior pastor is John K. Jenkins Sr..

History

The church has its origins in a 1917 house Bible study group led by Robert Warren and his wife. In 1920 it opened its first building in Glenarden. In 1989, John K. Jenkins Sr. became the senior pastor of the 500-member church. In 2007, it opened a new building in Upper Marlboro, with a 4,000 seat auditorium. In 2012, it won its third Hoodie Award for Best African American Church for its positive influence in its community. In 2018, it inaugurated a community center with a gymnasium and a health club. According to a church census released in 2018, it claimed a weekly attendance of 10,548 people, and has 127 different ministries. In 2021, it opened a Covid-19 vaccination center in her community center.

Beliefs 
The Church has a Baptist confession of faith and is a member of Converge.

See also

 List of the largest evangelical churches
 List of the largest evangelical church auditoriums
 Worship service (evangelicalism)

References and notes

External links

Baptist churches in Maryland
Evangelical megachurches in the United States
Megachurches in Maryland